Camboon is a rural locality in the Shire of Banana, Queensland, Australia.

Geography 
Dingley Dell is a neighbourhood in the north-east of the locality.

There are a number of protected areas in the locality within:

 Montour State Forest in the north-east of locality (extending into neighbouring Rawbelle to the east)
 Camboon State Forest in the south-east of the locality (extending into neighbouring Cracow to the south)
Apart from the protected areas, the predominant land use is grazing on native vegetation.

Camboon has the following mountains:

 Bald Mountain 
 Dicks Lookout 
 Mount Appenben 
 Mount Coangal 
 Mount Kable 
 Mount Kandoonan 
 Mount Mungungal 
 Mount Okangal 
 Mount Ox 
 Mount Shirley

History
The name Camboon is believed to be derived from the Aboriginal word caamboon meaning the bullrushes growing at the edge of waterholes.

On Tuesday 7 May 1868, the Queensland Government auctioned 32 town lots, each , in the town of Camboon.

A post office opened on 1 June 1874. It  closed on 16 October 1965.

Camboon Provisional School opened about 1899 but closed in 1908 due to low enrolments. In 1910, the school was reopened but only operated half-time in conjunction with the newly opened Camboon Woolshed Provisional School. Both schools were closed in 1915.

Clare Provisional School opened on 19 July 1921. Newestella Provisional School opened on 29 August 1921. The two schools were operated as half-time schools in conjunction (meaning that they shared a teacher between them). Both schools closed in December 1923 due to low student numbers.

Education 
There are no schools in Camboon. The nearest government primary schools are Theodore State School in Theodore to the west and Thangool State School in neighbouring Thangool to the north-east. The nearest government secondary schools are Theodore State School (to Year 10), Biloela State High School in Biloela to the north and Moura State High School in Moura to the north-west. However, the distances to these schools may be too far for a daily commute from some parts of the locality; distance education and boarding schools are the other options.

Events
Camboon hosts an annual campdraft every May.

References

Shire of Banana
Localities in Queensland